General elections were held in South Africa on 18 May 1938 to elect the 150 members of the House of Assembly. The United Party won an absolute majority.

Background
The National Party (led by the Prime Minister J. B. M. Hertzog) and the South African Party (whose leader was the Deputy Prime Minister Jan Smuts) were in coalition at the time of the 1933 South African general election.

After the election the two coalition parties fused, to become the United South African National Party (commonly known as the United Party). The formal launch of the new party took place on 5 December 1934.

Those members of the National Party who did not accept the fusion, constituted themselves as the Purified National Party (PNP) in June 1934. The leader of the new party was Dr D.F. Malan, who had been the National Party leader in Cape Province. Eighteen MPs joined the PNP caucus. Dr Malan became the Leader of the Opposition, in the House of Assembly.

The members of the South African Party who rejected the fusion, formed the Dominion Party. Its leader was Colonel C.F. Stallard.

Changes to the franchise and representation
Under the Representation of Natives Act 1936, all registered black voters in the Cape Province were removed from the common voters' lists and placed on a special Cape Natives voters' roll. This served to effectively dismantle the traditional multi-racial "Cape Qualified Franchise" system.

Black voters had never been entitled to vote in Transvaal and the Orange Free State. Few had ever qualified in Natal.

The voters' rolls, for 1935, were broken down by race in each province (using the racial classifications in use in South Africa at the time).

No black voters were eligible to participate in the 1938 general election, apart from the one from Natal. The three (white) Native Representative Members from Cape Province were elected on a different date, for a term (expiring on 30 June immediately following a period of five years after the previous election) unaffected by dissolutions of Parliament.

The first group of native representatives had been elected in June 1937. The term for which they were elected expired on 30 June 1942. The representatives took their seats in the House of Assembly in 1938, and sat as Independent MPs.

Delimitation of electoral divisions
The South Africa Act 1909 had provided for a delimitation commission to define the boundaries for each electoral division. The representation by province, under the seventh delimitation report of 1937, is set out in the table below. The figures in brackets are the number of electoral divisions in the previous (1932) delimitation. If there is no figure in brackets then the number was unchanged.

The above table does not include the three Native representative seats in Cape Province, which were not included in the delimitation of the general roll seats under the South Africa Act 1909.

Nominations
Candidates nominated for the election, by party, were United 150, Purified National 103, Labour 37, Dominion 33, Independent 31, Greyshirts 3 and Socialists 3. Total 360.

Results

By province

References

 Keesing's Contemporary Archives
 Smuts: A Reappraisal, by Bernard Friedman (George, Allen & Unwin 1975) 
 South Africa 1982 Official Yearbook of the Republic of South Africa, published by Chris van Rensburg Publications
 The South African Constitution, by H.J. May (3rd edition 1955, Juta & Co

General elections in South Africa
South Africa
General
May 1938 events